This is a list of Penn State Nittany Lions football players in the NFL draft.

Key

Players

Notable undrafted players

References

Penn State Nittany Lions

Penn State Nittany Lions NFL draft